The Lives of the Most Excellent Painters, Sculptors, and Architects, often simply known as The Lives, is a series of artist biographies written by 16th-century Italian painter and architect Giorgio Vasari, which is considered "perhaps the most famous, and even today the most-read work of the older literature of art", "some of the Italian Renaissance's most influential writing on art", and "the first important book on art history".

Vasari published the work in two editions with substantial differences between them; the first edition, two volumes, in 1550 and the second, three volumes, in 1568 (which is the one usually translated and referred to). One important change was the increased attention paid to Venetian art in the second edition, even though Vasari still was, and has ever since been, criticised for an excessive emphasis on the art of his native Florence.

Background
The writer Paolo Giovio expressed his desire to compose a treatise on contemporary artists at a party in the house of Cardinal Farnese, who asked Vasari to provide Giovio with as much relevant information as possible. Giovio instead yielded the project to Vasari.

As the first Italian art historian, Vasari initiated the genre of an encyclopedia of artistic biographies that continues today. Vasari's work was first published in 1550 by Lorenzo Torrentino in Florence, and dedicated to Cosimo I de' Medici, Grand Duke of Tuscany. It included a valuable treatise on the technical methods employed in the arts. It was partly rewritten and enlarged in 1568 and provided with woodcut portraits of artists (some conjectural).

The work has a consistent and notorious favour of Florentines and tends to attribute to them all the new developments in Renaissance art – for example, the invention of engraving. Venetian art in particular, let alone other parts of Europe, is systematically ignored. Between his first and second editions, Vasari visited Venice and the second edition gave more attention to Venetian art (finally including Titian) without achieving a neutral point of view. John Symonds claimed in 1899 that, "It is clear that Vasari often wrote with carelessness, confusing dates and places, and taking no pains to verify the truth of his assertions" (in regards to Vasari's life of Nicola Pisano), while acknowledging that, despite these shortcomings, it is one of the basic sources for information on the Renaissance in Italy.

Vasari's biographies are interspersed with amusing gossip. Many of his anecdotes have the ring of truth, although likely inventions. Others are generic fictions, such as the tale of young Giotto painting a fly on the surface of a painting by Cimabue that the older master repeatedly tried to brush away, a genre tale that echoes anecdotes told of the Greek painter Apelles. He did not research archives for exact dates, as modern art historians do, and naturally his biographies are most dependable for the painters of his own generation and the immediately preceding one. Modern criticism—with all the new materials opened up by research—has corrected many of his traditional dates and attributions. The work is widely considered a classic even today, though it is widely agreed that it must be supplemented by modern scientific research.

Vasari includes a forty-two-page sketch of his own biography at the end of his Vite, and adds further details about himself and his family in his lives of Lazzaro Vasari and Francesco de' Rossi.

Influence
Vasari's Vite has been described as "by far the most influential single text for the history of Renaissance art" and "the most important work of Renaissance biography of artists". Its influence is situated mainly in three domains: as an example for contemporary and later biographers and art historians, as a defining factor in the view on the Renaissance and the role of Florence and Rome in it, and as a major source of information on the lives and works of early Renaissance artists from Italy.

The Vite has been translated wholly or partially into many languages, including Dutch, English, French, German, Polish, Russian and Spanish.

Early translations became a model for others
The Vite formed a model for encyclopedias of artist biographies. Different 17th century translators became artist biographers in their own country of origin and were often called the Vasari of their country. Karel Van Mander was probably the first Vasarian author with his Painting book (Het Schilderboeck, 1604), which encompassed not only the first Dutch translation of Vasari, but also the first Dutch translation of Ovid and was accompanied by a list of Italian painters who appeared on the scene after Vasari, and the first comprehensive list of biographies of painters from the Low Countries. Similarly, Joachim von Sandrart, author of Deutsche Akademie (1675), became known as the "German Vasari" and Antonio Palomino, author of An account of the lives and works of the most eminent Spanish painters, sculptors and architects (1724), became the "Spanish Vasari". In England, Aglionby's Painting Illustrated from 1685 was largely based on Vasari as well. In Florence the biographies of artists were revised and implemented in the late 17th century by Filippo Baldinucci.

View of the Renaissance
The Vite is also important as the basis for discussions about the development of style. It influenced the view art historians had of the Early Renaissance for a long time, placing too much emphasis on the achievements of Florentine and Roman artists while ignoring those of the rest of Italy and certainly the artists from the rest of Europe.

Source of information
For centuries, it has been the most important source of information on Early Renaissance Italian (and especially Tuscan) painters and the attribution of their paintings. In 1899, John Addington Symonds used the Vite as one of his basic sources for the description of artists in his seven books on the Renaissance in Italy, and nowadays it is still, despite its obvious biases and shortcomings, the basis for the biographies of many artists like Leonardo da Vinci.

Contents of the 1568 edition
The Vite contains the biographies of many important Italian artists, and is also adopted as a sort of classical reference guide for their names, which are sometimes used in different ways. What follows is the complete list of artists appearing the second (1568) edition. In a few cases, different very short biographies were given in one section.

Volumes and parts
The 1568 edition was published in three volumes. Vasari divided the biographies into three parts. Parts I and II are contained in the first volume. Part III is presented in the two other volumes.

Volume 1
The first volume starts with a dedication to Cosimo I de' Medici and a preface, and then provides technical and background texts about architecture, sculpture, and painting. A second preface follows, introducing the actual "Vite".

Biographies, first part

 Cimabue
 Arnolfo di Lapo, with Bonanno
 Nicola and Giovanni Pisano
 Andrea Tafi
 Gaddo Gaddi
 Margaritone
 Giotto, with Puccio Capanna
 Agostino and Agnolo
 Stefano and Ugolino
 Pietro Lorenzetti (Pietro Laurati)
 Andrea Pisano
 Buonamico Buffalmacco
 Ambrogio Lorenzetti (Ambruogio Laurati)
 Pietro Cavallini
 Simone Martini with Lippo Memmi
 Taddeo Gaddi
 Andrea Orcagna (Andrea di Cione)
 Tommaso Fiorentino (Giottino)
 Giovanni da Ponte
 Agnolo Gaddi with Cennino Cennini
 Berna Sanese (Barna da Siena)
 Duccio
 Antonio Viniziano (Antonio Veneziano)
 Jacopo di Casentino
 Spinello Aretino
 Gherardo Starnina
 Lippo
 Lorenzo Monaco
 Taddeo Bartoli
 Lorenzo di Bicci with Bicci di Lorenzo and Neri di Bicci

Biographies, second part

 Jacopo della Quercia
 Niccolo Aretino (Niccolò di Piero Lamberti)
 Dello (Dello di Niccolò Delli)
 Nanni di Banco
 Luca della Robbia with Andrea and Girolamo della Robbia
 Paolo Uccello
 Lorenzo Ghiberti with Niccolò di Piero Lamberti
 Masolino da Panicale
 Parri Spinelli
 Masaccio
 Filippo Brunelleschi
 Donatello
 Michelozzo Michelozzi with Pagno di Lapo Portigiani
 Antonio Filarete and Simone (Simone Ghini)
 Giuliano da Maiano
 Piero della Francesca
 Fra Angelico with Domenico di Michelino and Attavante
 Leon Battista Alberti
 Lazaro Vasari
 Antonello da Messina
 Alesso Baldovinetti
 Vellano da Padova (Bartolomeo Bellano)
 Fra Filippo Lippi with Fra Diamante and Jacopo del Sellaio
 Paolo Romano, Mino del Reame, Chimenti Camicia, and Baccio Pontelli
 Andrea del Castagno and Domenico Veneziano
 Gentile da Fabriano
 Vittore Pisanello
 Pesello and Francesco Pesellino
 Benozzo Gozzoli with Melozzo da Forlì
 Francesco di Giorgio and Vecchietta (Lorenzo di Pietro)
 Galasso Ferrarese with Cosmè Tura
 Antonio and Bernardo Rossellino
 Desiderio da Settignano
 Mino da Fiesole
 Lorenzo Costa with Ludovico Mazzolino
 Ercole Ferrarese
 Jacopo, Giovanni and Gentile Bellini with Niccolò Rondinelli and Benedetto Coda
 Cosimo Rosselli
 Il Cecca (Francesco d'Angelo)
 Don Bartolomeo Abbate di S. Clemente (Bartolomeo della Gatta) with Matteo Lappoli
 Gherardo di Giovanni del Fora
 Domenico Ghirlandaio with Benedetto, David Ghirlandaio and Bastiano Mainardi
 Antonio del Pollaiuolo and Piero del Pollaiuolo with Maso Finiguerra
 Sandro Botticelli
 Benedetto da Maiano
 Andrea del Verrocchio with Benedetto and Santi Buglioni
 Andrea Mantegna
 Filippino Lippi
 Bernardino Pinturicchio with Niccolò Alunno and Gerino da Pistoia
 Francesco Francia with Caradosso
 Pietro Perugino with Rocco Zoppo, Francesco Bacchiacca, Eusebio da San Giorgio and Andrea Aloigi (l'Ingegno)
 Vittore Scarpaccia with Stefano da Verona, Jacopo Avanzi, Altichiero, Jacobello del Fiore, Guariento di Arpo, Giusto de' Menabuoi, Vincenzo Foppa, Vincenzo Catena, Cima da Conegliano, Marco Basaiti, Bartolomeo Vivarini, Giovanni di Niccolò Mansueti, Vittore Belliniano, Bartolomeo Montagna, Benedetto Rusconi, Giovanni Buonconsiglio, Simone Bianco, Tullio Lombardo, Vincenzo Civerchio, Girolamo Romani, Alessandro Bonvicino (il Moretto), Francesco Bonsignori, Giovanni Francesco Caroto and Francesco Torbido (il Moro)
 Iacopo detto l'Indaco (Jacopo Torni)
 Luca Signorelli with Tommaso Bernabei (il Papacello)

Volume 2
Biographies, third part

 Leonardo da Vinci
 Giorgione da Castelfranco
 Antonio da Correggio
 Piero di Cosimo
 Donato Bramante (Bramante da Urbino)
 Fra Bartolomeo Di San Marco
 Mariotto Albertinelli
 Raffaellino del Garbo
 Pietro Torrigiano (Torrigiano)
 Giuliano da Sangallo
 Antonio da Sangallo
 Raphael
 Guillaume de Marcillat
 Simone del Pollaiolo (il Cronaca)
 Davide Ghirlandaio and Benedetto Ghirlandaio
 Domenico Puligo
 Andrea da Fiesole
 Vincenzo da San Gimignano and Timoteo da Urbino
 Andrea Sansovino (Andrea dal Monte Sansovino)
 Benedetto da Rovezzano
 Baccio da Montelupo and Raffaello da Montelupo (father and son)
 Lorenzo di Credi
 Boccaccio Boccaccino (Boccaccino Cremonese)
 Lorenzetto
 Baldassare Peruzzi
 Pellegrino da Modena (Pellegrino Aretusi)
 Giovan Francesco, also known as il Fattore
 Andrea del Sarto
 Properzia de' Rossi, with suor Plautilla Nelli, Lucrezia Quistelli and Sofonisba Anguissola (the only women to feature in the Lives)
 Alfonso Lombardi
 Michele Agnolo (Giovanni Angelo Montorsoli)
 Girolamo Santacroce
 Dosso Dossi and Battista Dossi (Dossi brothers)
 Giovanni Antonio Licino
 Rosso Fiorentino
 Giovanni Antonio Sogliani
 Girolamo da Treviso (Girolamo Da Trevigi)
 Polidoro da Caravaggio and Maturino da Firenze (Maturino Fiorentino)
 Bartolommeo Ramenghi (Bartolomeo Da Bagnacavallo)
 Marco Calabrese
 Morto Da Feltro
 Franciabigio
 Francesco Mazzola (Il Parmigianino)
 Jacopo Palma (Il Palma)
 Lorenzo Lotto
 Fra Giocondo
 Francesco Granacci
 Baccio d'Agnolo
 Valerio Vicentino (Valerio Belli), Giovanni da Castel Bolognese (Giovanni Bernardi) and Matteo dal Nasaro Veronese
 Marcantonio Bolognese
 Antonio da Sangallo
 Giulio Romano
 Sebastiano del Piombo (Sebastiano Viniziano)
 Perino Del Vaga

Volume 3
Biographies, third part (continued)

 Domenico Beccafumi
 Giovann'Antonio Lappoli
 Niccolò Soggi
 Niccolò detto il Tribolo
 Pierino da Vinci
 Baccio Bandinelli
 Giuliano Bugiardini
 Cristofano Gherardi
 Jacopo da Pontormo
 Simone Mosca
 Girolamo Genga, Bartolommeo Genga and Giovanbatista San Marino (Giovanni Battista Belluzzi)
 Michele Sanmicheli with Paolo Veronese (Paulino) and Paolo Farinati
 Giovannantonio detto il Soddoma da Verzelli
 Bastiano detto Aristotile da San Gallo
 Benedetto Garofalo and Girolamo da Carpi with Bramantino and Bernardino Gatti (il Soiaro)
 Ridolfo Ghirlandaio, Davide Ghirlandaio and Benedetto Ghirlandaio
 Giovanni da Udine
 Battista Franco with Jacopo Tintoretto and Andrea Schiavone
 Francesco Rustichi
 Fra' Giovann'Agnolo Montorsoli
 Francesco detto de' Salviati with Giuseppe Porta
 Daniello Ricciarelli da Volterra
 Taddeo Zucchero with Federico Zuccari
 Michelangelo Buonarroti (Michelangelo) with Tiberio Calcagni and Marcello Venusti
 Francesco Primaticcio with Giovanni Battista Ramenghi (il Bagnacavallo Jr.), Prospero Fontana, Niccolò dell'Abbate, Domenico del Barbieri, Lorenzo Sabatini, Pellegrino Tibaldi, Luca Longhi, Livio Agresti, Marco Marchetti, Giovanni Boscoli and Bartolomeo Passarotti
 Tiziano da Cadore (Titian) with Jacopo Bassano, Giovanni Maria Verdizotti, Jan van Calcar (Giovanni fiammingo) and Paris Bordon
 Jacopo Sansovino with Andrea Palladio, Alessandro Vittoria, Bartolomeo Ammannati and Danese Cattaneo
 Lione Aretino (Leone Leoni) with Guglielmo Della Porta and Galeazzo Alessi
 Giulio Clovio, manuscript illuminator
 Various Italian artists: Girolamo Siciolante da Sermoneta, Marcello Venusti, Iacopino del Conte, Dono Doni, Cesare Nebbia and Niccolò Circignani detto il Pomarancio
 Bronzino
 Giorgio Vasari

Editions

There have been numerous editions and translations of the Lives over the years. Many have been abridgements due to the great length of the original.

The first English-language translation by Eliza Foster (as "Mrs. Jonathan Foster") was published by Henry George Bohn in 1850-51, with careful and abundant annotations. According to professor Patricia Rubin of New York University, "her translation of Vasari brought the Lives to a wide English-language readership for the first time. Its very real value in doing so is proven by the fact that it remained in print and in demand through the nineteenth century."  

The most recent new English translation is by Peter and Julia Conaway Bondanella, published in the Oxford World's Classics series in 1991.

Versions online
Italian
 1550 edition Progetto Manuzio (PDF)
 1550 edition Selections drawn from a 1768 reprint
 1568 edition, Vol. 1 in the Internet Archive (biographies from Cimabue to Signorelli)
 1568 edition, Vol. 2 in the Internet Archive (biographies from Leonardo to Perino del Vaga)
 1568 edition, Vol. 3 in the Internet Archive (biographies from Beccafumi to Vasari)

English
 Giorgio Vasari's Lives of the Artists Website created by Adrienne DeAngelis. Currently incomplete, intended to be unabridged
 Stories Of The Italian Artists From Vasari Translated by E. L. Seeley, 1908, abridged

See also
 Egg of Columbus (Lives contains a similar story to the Columbus' egg story)

References

Sources

External links

Free English translation of the work divided into ten ebooks at Project Gutenberg 
Original Italian version from 1568 on archive.org
 
Excerpts from the Vite combined with photos of works mentioned by Vasari.
Gli artisti principali citati dal Vasari nelle Vite (elenco)
 

Giorgio Vasari
1550 books
1568 books
Biographies about artists
Italian books
Vasari
Art history books
Architecture books